Hubert Vigilance (born 17 November 1928) was a Guyanese cricketer. He played in one first-class match for British Guiana in 1944/45.

See also
 List of Guyanese representative cricketers

References

External links
 

1928 births
Possibly living people
Guyanese cricketers
Guyana cricketers